Farmakida Cove, Alexander Island
 Fartuni Nunatak, Oscar II Coast
 Feniks Island, Trinity Island
 Feya Tarn, Livingston Island
 Ficheto Point, Livingston Island 
 Filip Totyu Nunatak, Oscar II Coast
 Finaeus Cove, Graham Coast
 Mount Fisek, Bastien Range
 Fizalia Island, Trinity Island
 Flamingo Beach, Greenwich Island 
 Fletcher Nunatak, Livingston Island
 Fonfon Glacier, Sentinel Range
 Foros Spur, Sentinel Range
 Fontus Lake, Livingston Island
 Fregata Island, Nelson Island
 Friesland Ridge, Livingston Island 
 Frisius Point, Nelson Island
 Frolosh Point, Anvers Island  
 Fruzhin Peak, Sentinel Range  
 Fucha Peak, Sentinel Range
 Furen Point, Oscar II Coast

See also 
 Bulgarian toponyms in Antarctica

External links 
 Bulgarian Antarctic Gazetteer
 SCAR Composite Gazetteer of Antarctica
 Antarctic Digital Database (ADD). Scale 1:250000 topographic map of Antarctica with place-name search.
 L. Ivanov. Bulgarian toponymic presence in Antarctica. Polar Week at the National Museum of Natural History in Sofia, 2–6 December 2019

Bibliography 
 J. Stewart. Antarctica: An Encyclopedia. Jefferson, N.C. and London: McFarland, 2011. 1771 pp.  
 L. Ivanov. Bulgarian Names in Antarctica. Sofia: Manfred Wörner Foundation, 2021. Second edition. 539 pp.  (in Bulgarian)
 G. Bakardzhieva. Bulgarian toponyms in Antarctica. Paisiy Hilendarski University of Plovdiv: Research Papers. Vol. 56, Book 1, Part A, 2018 – Languages and Literature, pp. 104-119 (in Bulgarian)
 L. Ivanov and N. Ivanova. Bulgarian names. In: The World of Antarctica. Generis Publishing, 2022. pp. 114-115. 

Antarctica
 
Bulgarian toponyms in Antarctica
Names of places in Antarctica